The interleukin-27 receptor is a type I cytokine receptor for interleukin-27. It is a heterodimer composed of  the interleukin 27 receptor, alpha subunit and glycoprotein 130.

IL27RA essential for transcriptional activation of STAT1 and for augmenting the induction of T-bet expression during initiation of Th1 cell differentiation.

References

External links
 

Type I cytokine receptors